Duke of Edinburgh, named after the city of Edinburgh in Scotland, is a substantive title that has been created four times since 1726 for members of the British royal family. It does not include any territorial landholdings and does not produce any revenue for the title-holder.

The current holder, Prince Edward, was created duke in 2023 on his 59th birthday by his eldest brother, King Charles III. The dukedom had previously been granted to their father, then Philip Mountbatten, on the day of his marriage to then-Princess Elizabeth, the future Queen Elizabeth II. Upon Philip's death, the title was inherited by Charles and held by him until Elizabeth died and Charles became king, at which time the title reverted to the Crown.

1726 creation

The title was first created in the Peerage of Great Britain on 26 July 1726 by King George I, who bestowed it on his grandson Prince Frederick, who also became Prince of Wales the following year. The subsidiary titles of the dukedom were Marquess of the Isle of Ely, Earl of Eltham, in the County of Kent, Viscount of Launceston, in the County of Cornwall, and Baron of Snowdon, in the County of Caernarvon, all of which were also in the Peerage of Great Britain. The marquessate was gazetted as Marquess of the Isle of Wight, apparently erroneously. In later editions of the London Gazette the Duke is referred to as the Marquess of the Isle of Ely. Upon Frederick's death, the titles were inherited by his son Prince George. When Prince George became King George III in 1760, the titles merged in the Crown and ceased to exist.

1866 creation

Queen Victoria re-created the title, this time in the Peerage of the United Kingdom, on 24 May 1866 for her second son Prince Alfred, instead of Duke of York, the traditional title of the second son of the monarch. The subsidiary titles of the dukedom were Earl of Kent and Earl of Ulster, also in the Peerage of the United Kingdom. When Alfred became the Duke of Saxe-Coburg and Gotha in 1893, he retained his British titles. His only son that survived birth, Alfred, Hereditary Prince of Saxe-Coburg and Gotha, committed suicide in 1899, so the Dukedom of Edinburgh and subsidiary titles became extinct upon the elder Alfred's death in 1900.

1947 creation

The title was created for a third time on 19 November 1947 by King George VI, who bestowed it on his son-in-law Philip Mountbatten, when he married Princess Elizabeth. Subsequently, Elizabeth was styled "HRH The Princess Elizabeth, Duchess of Edinburgh" until her accession in 1952. The subsidiary titles of the dukedom were Earl of Merioneth and Baron Greenwich, of Greenwich in the County of London; all these titles were in the Peerage of the United Kingdom. Earlier that year, Philip had renounced his Greek and Danish royal titles (he was born a prince of Greece and Denmark, being a male-line grandson of King George I of Greece and male-line great-grandson of King Christian IX of Denmark) along with his rights to the Greek throne. In 1957, Philip became a prince of the United Kingdom.

Upon Philip's death on 9 April 2021, his eldest son, Charles, Prince of Wales, succeeded to all of his hereditary titles. Upon Charles's accession to the throne on 8 September 2022, the peerages merged in the Crown and ceased to exist.

2023 creation
It was announced in 1999, at the time of his wedding, that Prince Edward would eventually be granted the Dukedom of Edinburgh. The idea came from Prince Philip, who unexpectedly conveyed his wish to Edward and his fiancée, Sophie Rhys-Jones, only days before their wedding. Edward, then seventh in the line of succession to the British throne, was touched because he expected the dukedom to be granted to Prince Andrew, his older brother.

Prince Philip died in April 2021. His dukedom was inherited by his eldest son, Prince Charles, who was to give it to Edward upon becoming king according to Philip's wish. Edward, who had by then dropped to the 14th place in the line of succession due to births of those higher in line, said in June that him getting such a prestigious title was "a pipe dream of my father’s". In July, The Times reported that Charles had decided not to give the title to his brother. Clarence House did not deny the reports, which were met with disapproval by commentators due to Edward and Sophie's increased role in the monarchy after Andrew withdrew from public life and Charles's son Prince Harry and daughter-in-law Meghan quit royal duties.

It was suggested in November 2022, shortly after Charles III ascended the throne, that Buckingham Palace was considering saving the dukedom for the new king's granddaughter Princess Charlotte of Wales in recognition of her high place in the line of succession and her being the first female member of the royal family whose place in the line of succession cannot be superseded by a younger brother.

The dukedom was bestowed on Prince Edward on the occasion of his 59th birthday on 10 March 2023. This fourth creation of the title is, however, a life peerage, allowing Charles to honour his father's wish and reward his brother and sister-in-law while making it possible for Charles's heir-apparent, Prince William, to confer it on one of his children. According to Camilla Tominey of The Daily Telegraph, the announcement of the resignation of the pro-independence Scottish leader Nicola Sturgeon in February 2023 made it possible for the dukedom, associated with Scotland's capital, to be granted to Edward, who is otherwise "arguably too far down the line of succession to hold a title of such constitutional (and political) significance".

Dukes of Edinburgh

First creation, 1726

Also: Marquess of the Isle of Ely, Earl of Eltham, Viscount Launceston and Baron Snowdon.

| Prince FrederickHouse of Hanover1726–1751also: Prince of Wales (1729), Duke of Cornwall (1727, created 1337), Duke of Rothesay (1727, created 1469)
| 
| 1 February 1707Leineschloss, Hanoverson of King George II and Queen Caroline
| Princess Augusta of Saxe-Gotha17 April 17369 children
| 31 March 1751Leicester House, Leicester Square, Londonaged 44
|-
| Prince GeorgeHouse of Hanover1751–1760also: Prince of Wales (1751) 
| 
| 4 June 1738Norfolk House, Londonson of Prince Frederick and Princess Augusta
| Princess Charlotte of Mecklenburg-Strelitz8 September 176115 children
| 29 January 1820Windsor Castle, Windsoraged 81
|-
| colspan=5|Prince George succeeded as George III in 1760 upon his grandfather's death, and his titles merged in the Crown.
|-
|}

Second creation, 1866

Also: Earl of Kent and Earl of Ulster.

| Prince AlfredHouse of Saxe-Coburg and Gotha1866–1900also Duke of Saxe-Coburg and Gotha (1893)
| 
| 6 August 1844Windsor Castle, Windsorson of Queen Victoria and Prince Albert
| Grand Duchess Maria Alexandrovna of Russia23 January 18746 children
| 30 July 1900Schloss Rosenau, Coburgaged 55
|-
| colspan=5|Prince Alfred and Grand Duchess Maria had two sons, one stillborn, one who predeceased him; and all his titles became extinct on his death.
|-
|}

Third creation, 1947

Also: Earl of Merioneth and Baron Greenwich.

| Prince PhilipMountbatten family/House of Glücksburg (by birth)1947–2021
| 
| 10 June 1921Mon Repos, Corfuson of Prince Andrew of Greece and Denmark and Princess Alice of Battenberg
| Princess Elizabeth20 November 19474 children
| 9 April 2021Windsor Castle, Windsoraged 99
|-
| rowspan="2" | Prince CharlesHouse of Windsor2021–2022 
| rowspan="2" | 
| rowspan="2" | 14 November 1948Buckingham Palace, Londonson of Prince Philip and Queen Elizabeth II
| Lady Diana Spencer29 July 19812 children
| rowspan="2" | Living
|-
| Camilla Parker Bowles9 April 2005No issue
|-
| colspan="5" | Prince Charles succeeded as Charles III in 2022 upon his mother's death, and his titles merged in the Crown.
|}

Fourth creation, 2023 

| Prince EdwardHouse of Windsor2023–presentalso: Earl of Wessex (1999), Earl of Forfar (2019), Viscount Severn (1999)
| 
| 10 March 1964Buckingham Palace, Londonson of Queen Elizabeth II and Prince Philip
| Sophie Rhys-Jones19 June 19992 children
| Living
|-
| colspan=5|The dukedom will be held for Prince Edward’s lifetime as a non-hereditary peerage title.
|}

Family tree

Heraldry

Here are the achievements of the various Dukes of Edinburgh:

In media

A fictional Duke of Edinburgh appears in the 1983 sitcom The Black Adder. Rowan Atkinson plays the title character, Prince Edmund, who is granted the title Duke of Edinburgh by his father, a fictitious King Richard IV.

See also

Duke of Gloucester and Edinburgh
Duchess of Edinburgh

References

British monarchy
Prince Philip, Duke of Edinburgh
Charles III
1726 establishments in Great Britain
1866 establishments in the United Kingdom
2022 disestablishments in the United Kingdom
2023 establishments in the United Kingdom
British and Irish peerages which merged in the Crown
Noble titles created in 1726
Noble titles created in 1866
Noble titles created in 1947
Noble titles created in 2023